Dogma is a 12" EP by the New Zealand band Tall Dwarfs, released in 1987.

Track listing

References

Tall Dwarfs albums
1987 EPs
Flying Nun Records EPs